Francisco Bojado (born 11 May 1983) is a Mexican former professional boxer who competed from 2001 to 2007. As an amateur, he competed at the 2000 Summer Olympics. Francisco is also the brother of amateur boxer, Angel Bojado.

Amateur career
He compiled an amateur record of 168–15 and represented Mexico at the 2000 Olympic Games in Sydney, Australia.

Francisco lost in the second qualifying round at the games. He returned home with his eyes set on turning professional. Shortly after, he was signed by Shelly Finkel, a man who also managed Evander Holyfield and Mike Tyson, among many others. Finkel soon helped Bojado sign a multi-fight deal with cable television channel Showtime.

Professional career
On January 13, 2001, he made his professional debut by beating Derrick Castor by knockout in the second round in Uncasville, Connecticut. He followed that victory with eight more knockout wins, including wins over veterans Mauro Lucero, Glenn Forde and Eleazar Contreras. But on February 16, 2002, also in Uncasville, he was upset by Juan Carlos Rubio, who beat him by a ten-round decision. He would later avenge the loss to Rubio, by 12-round decision.

On January 24, 2004, Francisco defeated experienced Emmanuel Clottey in Atlantic City, New Jersey.

On July 24, however, he suffered another setback, when former world Jr. Lightweight champion Jesse James Leija beat him by a split ten-round decision. He walked away from the sport following the loss.

In April 2007, Bojado signed a deal with promotional company Golden Boy Promotions, and made his return to the ring on May 4, 2007, against Dairo Esalas at the MGM Grand in Las Vegas. Bojado won a unanimous decision.

On October 6, 2007, Stephen Forbes won a split-decision upset over Bojado in a junior welterweight bout.

Outside the ring
Bojado made an appearance on the HBO short series De La Hoya/Mayweather 24/7 as a sparring partner for Oscar De La Hoya.

Bojado was arrested in 2011 after allegedly failing to stop at US Border security, which resulted in shots being fired at him by police.

In 2013 Bojado got back into the ring and started training.

Professional record

|- style="margin:0.5em auto; font-size:95%;"
|align="center" colspan=8|18 Wins (12 knockouts), 3 Losses, 0 Draw
|- style="margin:0.5em auto; font-size:95%;"
|align=center style="border-style: none none solid solid; background: #e3e3e3"|Res.
|align=center style="border-style: none none solid solid; background: #e3e3e3"|Record
|align=center style="border-style: none none solid solid; background: #e3e3e3"|Opponent
|align=center style="border-style: none none solid solid; background: #e3e3e3"|Type
|align=center style="border-style: none none solid solid; background: #e3e3e3"|Rd., Time
|align=center style="border-style: none none solid solid; background: #e3e3e3"|Date
|align=center style="border-style: none none solid solid; background: #e3e3e3"|Location
|align=center style="border-style: none none solid solid; background: #e3e3e3"|Notes
|-align=center
|Loss || 18- || align=left| Steve Forbes (boxer)
|SD || 10 (10) || Oct 6, 2007 || align=left|Mandalay Bay Resort & Casino, Las Vegas, Nevada
|align=left|
|-align=center
|Win || 18-2 || align=left| Rogelio Castañeda, Jr.
|TKO || 10 (1:30) || Jul 27, 2007 || align=left|Desert Diamond Casino, Tucson, Arizona
|align=left|
|-align=center
|Win || 17-2 || align=left| Dairo Esalas
|UD || 10 (10) || May 4, 2007 || align=left|Boardwalk Hall, Atlantic City, New Jersey
|align=left|
|-align=center
|Loss || 16-2 || align=left| Jesse James Leija
|UD || 10 (10) || Jul 24, 2004 || align=left|Mohegan Sun Casino, Uncasville, Connecticut
|align=left|
|-align=center
|Win || 16-1 ||align=left| Andre Eason
|UD || 10 (10) || May 8, 2004 || align=left|Casino Del Sol, Tucson, Arizona
|align=left|
|-align=center
|Win || 15-1 ||align=left| Emmanuel Clottey
|UD || 10 (10) || Jan 24, 2004 || align=left|Boardwalk Hall, Atlantic City, New Jersey
|align=left|
|-align=center
|Win || 14-1 ||align=left| Juan Carlos Rubio
|UD || 12 (12) || Nov 22, 2003 || align=left|Reliant Park, Houston, Texas
|align=left|IBA Continental and WBC Continental Americas titles
|-align=center
|Win || 13-1 ||align=left| Lemuel Nelson
|UD || 10 (10) || Aug 9, 2003 || align=left|Miami Arena, Miami, Florida
|align=left|
|-align=center
|Win || 12-1 || align=left| William Adamyan
|TKO || 6 (3:00) || May 10, 2003 || align=left|Pechanga Center, Temecula, California
|align=left|
|-align=center
|Win || 11-1 || align=left| Frankie Santos
|TKO || 10 (0:45) || Feb 1, 2003 || align=left|Mohegan Sun Casino, Uncasville, Connecticut
|align=left|
|-align=center
|Win || 10-1 ||align=left| Frankie Sanchez
|UD || 8 (8) || Oct 19, 2002 || align=left|Reliant Park, Houston, Texas
|align=left|
|-align=center
|Loss || 9-1 ||align=left| Juan Carlos Rubio
|UD || 10 (10) || Feb 16, 2002 || align=left|Mohegan Sun Casino, Uncasville, Connecticut
|align=left|
|-align=center
|Win || 9-0 ||align=left| Mauro Lucero
|KO || 1 (0:12) || Nov 3, 2001 || align=left|MGM Grand, Las Vegas, Nevada
|align=left|
|-align=center
|Win || 8-0 ||align=left| Eleazar Contreras
|KO || 2 (2:00) || Oct 13, 2001 || align=left|Tropicana Hotel & Casino, Atlantic City, New Jersey
|align=left|Won WBC Youth Light Welterweight title
|-align=center
|Win || 7-0 || align=left| Manuel Varela
|TKO || 1 (2:17) || Sep 1, 2001 || align=left|Don Haskins Convention Center, El Paso, Texas
|align=left|
|-align=center
|Win || 6-0 || align=left| Glenn Forde
|KO || 2 (0:08) || Jun 23, 2001 || align=left|Mohegan Sun Casino, Uncasville, Connecticut
|align=left|
|-align=center
|Win || 5-0 ||align=left| Ernesto Fuentes
|TKO || 1 (2:41) || May 19, 2001 || align=left|Mohegan Sun Casino, Uncasville, Connecticut
|align=left|
|-align=center
|Win || 4-0 ||align=left| David Montes
|KO || 3 (2:48) || May 5, 2001 || align=left|Don Haskins Convention Center, El Paso, Texas
|align=left|
|-align=center
|Win || 3-0 ||align=left| Mario Lacey
|KO || 1 (1:24) || Apr 20, 2001 || align=left|Ballys Park Hotel Casino, Atlantic City, New Jersey
|align=left|
|-align=center
|Win || 2-0 || align=left| Alejandro Rivera
|TKO || 1 (2:08) || Mar 2, 2001 || align=left|Texas Station Casino, North Las Vegas, Nevada
|align=left|
|-align=center
|Win || 1-0 || align=left| Detrick Castor
|TKO || 2 (1:38) || Jan 13, 2001 || align=left|Mohegan Sun Casino, Uncasville, Connecticut
|align=left|
|-align=center

References

External links

Boxers from Jalisco
Sportspeople from Guadalajara, Jalisco
Olympic boxers of Mexico
Boxers at the 2000 Summer Olympics
1983 births
Living people
Mexican male boxers
Welterweight boxers